Ishiwata (written:  or ) is a Japanese surname. Notable people with the surname include:

, Japanese footballer
, Japanese politician
, Japanese manga artist
, Japanese scientist

Japanese-language surnames